Robert Frank Milligan (born December 12, 1932) is a retired lieutenant general in the United States Marine Corps who served as Commander of the Pacific Fleet Marine Force. He is a graduate of the United States Naval Academy. After his retirement from the Marine Corps in 1991, he served as Comptroller of Florida from 1994 to 2002; director of the Department of Veterans Affairs, and member of the Florida Public Service Commission.

Milligan graduated from Matawan Regional High School in 1951 and was inducted into the school's hall of fame in 1997.

References

1932 births
Living people
Florida Comptrollers
Matawan Regional High School alumni
United States Marine Corps generals
United States Naval Academy alumni